The Abia State gubernatorial election of 2007 was the third gubernatorial election of Abia State. The Progressive Peoples Alliance nominee Theodore Orji was declared winner after defeating Onyema Ugochukwu of the People's Democratic Party.

References

Abia State gubernatorial elections
Abia gubernatorial election
Abia gubernatorial election